La Crosse Central High School is a public high school in La Crosse, Wisconsin. Administered by the School District of La Crosse, it is located on the south side of the city. The school was established in 1907.

History
La Crosse Central is the older of two public high schools in La Crosse, with rival Logan being the newer school. It was established in 1907. Originally, Central was located at the intersection of 16th and Cass Streets on La Crosse's south side, where Weigent Park stands today. The current building was completed in 1967 and stands on Losey Boulevard, near State Road.

Extra-curricular activities
La Crosse Central High School has a variety of extra-curricular activities and athletics, and is part of the Mississippi Valley Conference. 

Central's competitive show choir is called Grand Central Station. GCS was undefeated in the 2001, 2002 and 2014 seasons and since 2015 has hosted its own competition, the Grand River Show Choir Invitational.

State championships
Spring baseball: A-1978, A-1986
Boys' basketball: 1925, D2-2017
Boys' cross country: A-1977, D1-1990				
Girls' cross country: A-1985, A-1988, A-1989, D1-1990
Boys' golf: 1939
Girls' golf: 1990, 1991, 1992, 1993, 1998
Girls' gymnastics: A-1984
Boys' Alpine Skiing: 1969, 1974, 1975, 1984-1987
Girls’ skiing: 2002, 2003, 2004
Boys' track and field: A-1963

Notable alumni
M. Julian Bradley, member of the Wisconsin State Senate
Tony Ghelfi, major league baseball pitcher for Philadelphia Phillies
Don Iverson, professional golfer
Edward C. Krause, former member of the Wisconsin State Assembly
Joseph Losey, filmmaker, director of The Servant
Robert Moevs, composer
George Poage, First African American to earn a medal in the 1904 Olympics-Bronze
Nicholas Ray, filmmaker, director of Rebel Without A Cause
Woodrow Swancutt, U.S. Air Force Major General
Reuben Trane, founder of the Trane Company
Gregg Underheim, former member of the Wisconsin State Assembly
George Williams, major league baseball player
Johnny Davis, played college basketball at the University of Wisconsin, currently plays in the NBA for the Washington Wizards.

Notable faculty
D. Russell Wartinbee, music, history and social problems teacher, Wisconsin State Assembly
Guilford M. Wiley, principal, Wisconsin State Assembly

See also
List of high schools in Wisconsin

Notes

External links
La Crosse Central High School

Public high schools in Wisconsin
Buildings and structures in La Crosse, Wisconsin
Educational institutions established in 1907
Schools in La Crosse County, Wisconsin
1907 establishments in Wisconsin